The Senate Foreign Relations Subcommittee on Africa and Global Health Policy is one of seven subcommittees of the Senate Foreign Relations Committee.

Jurisdiction
The subcommittee deals with all matters concerning U.S. relations with countries in Africa (except those, like the countries of North Africa, specifically covered by other subcommittees), as well as regional intergovernmental organizations like the African Union and the Economic Community of West African States.  This subcommittee’s regional responsibilities include all matters within the geographic region, including matters relating to: (1) terrorism and non-proliferation; (2) crime and illicit narcotics; (3) U.S. foreign assistance programs; and (4) the promotion of U.S. trade and exports.

In addition, this subcommittee has global responsibility for health-related policy, including disease outbreak and response.

Members, 117th Congress

See also

United States House Foreign Affairs Subcommittee on Africa and Global Health

External links
Senate Committee on Foreign Relations
Senate Foreign Relations Committee Subcommittees and jurisdictions

Foreign Relations Senate African Affairs